Four Masters may refer to:

 Annals of the Four Masters, a chronicle of medieval Irish history
 Four Masters GAA, a GAA club in County Donegal
 Four Masters of the Yuan Dynasty, four famous painters during the Yuan Dynasty era in China
 Four Masters of the Ming Dynasty, four famous painters during the Ming Dynasty era in China